The 1935–36 season in Swedish football, starting August 1935 and ending July 1936:

Honours

Official titles

Competitions

Promotions, relegations and qualifications

Promotions

League transfers

Relegations

Domestic results

Allsvenskan 1935–36

Allsvenskan promotion play-off 1935–36

Division 2 Norra 1935–36

Division 2 Östra 1935–36

Division 2 Västra 1935–36

Division 2 Södra 1935–36

Division 2 promotion play-off 1935–36

Norrländska Mästerskapet 1936 
Final

National team results 

 Sweden: 

 Sweden: 

 Sweden: 

 Sweden: 

 Sweden: 

 Sweden: 

 Sweden: 

 Sweden:

National team players in season 1935–36

Notes

References 
Print

Online

 
Seasons in Swedish football